The 1956 United States presidential election in Oregon took place on November 6, 1956, as part of the 1956 United States presidential election. Voters chose six representatives, or electors, to the Electoral College, who voted for president and vice president.

Oregon was won by incumbent President Dwight D. Eisenhower (R–Pennsylvania), running with Vice President Richard Nixon, with 55.25% of the popular vote, against Adlai Stevenson (D–Illinois), running with Senator Estes Kefauver, with 44.75% of the popular vote. , this is the last election in which Clatsop County voted for a Republican presidential candidate.

Results

Results by county

See also
 United States presidential elections in Oregon

Notes

References

Oregon
1956
1956 Oregon elections